The 1999 Sri Lankan provincial council election was held on 25 January 1999, 6 April 1999 and 10 June 1999 to elect members to seven provincial councils in Sri Lanka. No election was held in the eighth province, North Eastern, which had been governed directly by the national government since March 1990. The People's Alliance, which was in power nationally, won the majority of seats in two provinces (North Central and North Western). It was also able to form a majority administration in the other five provinces with the support of smaller parties such as the Ceylon Workers' Congress.

Background

In an attempt to end the Sri Lankan Civil War, the Indo-Lanka Accord was signed on 29 July 1987. One of the requirements of the accord was that the Sri Lankan government to devolve powers to the provinces. Accordingly, on 14 November 1987, the Sri Lankan Parliament passed the 13th Amendment to the 1978 Constitution of Sri Lanka and the Provincial Councils Act No 42 of 1987. On 3 February 1988, nine provincial councils were created by order. The first elections for provincial councils took place on 28 April 1988 in North Central, North Western, Sabaragamuwa, and Uva provinces. On 2 June 1988, elections were held for provincial councils for Central, Southern and Western provinces. The United National Party (UNP), which was in power nationally, won control of all seven provincial councils.

The Indo-Lanka Accord also required the merger of the Eastern and Northern provinces into one administrative unit. The accord required a referendum to be held by 31 December 1988, in the Eastern Province to decide whether the merger should be permanent. Crucially, the accord allowed the Sri Lankan president to postpone the referendum at his discretion. On September 2 and 8 1988, President Jayewardene issued proclamations enabling the Eastern and Northern provinces to be one administrative unit administered by one elected council, creating the North Eastern Province. Elections in the newly merged North Eastern Province were held on 19 November 1988. The Eelam People's Revolutionary Liberation Front, an Indian backed paramilitary group, won control of the North Eastern provincial council.

On 1 March 1990, just as the Indian Peace Keeping Force were preparing to withdraw from Sri Lanka, Annamalai Varatharajah Perumal, Chief Minister of the North Eastern Province, moved a motion in the North Eastern Provincial Council declaring an independent Eelam. President Premadasa reacted to Permual's UDI by dissolving the provincial council and imposing direct rule on the province.

The 2nd Sri Lankan provincial council election was held in 1993 in seven provinces. The UNP retained control of six provincial councils but lost control of the largest provincial council, Western, to the opposition People's Alliance. A special election was held in Southern Province in 1994 after some UNP provincial councillors defected to the opposition. The PA won the election and took control of the Southern Provincial Council.

Results
The PA, which was now in power nationally, managed to win the majority of seats in two provinces (North Central and North Western). It was also able to form a majority administration in the other five provinces with the support of smaller parties such as the Ceylon Workers' Congress.

Overall

Central Province
Results of the 3rd Central provincial council election held on 6 April 1999:

North Central Province
Results of the 3rd North Central provincial council election held on 6 April 1999:

North Western Province
Results of the 3rd North Western provincial council election held on 25 January 1999:

Sabaragamuwa Province
Results of the 3rd Sabaragamuwa provincial council election held on 6 April 1999:

Southern Province
Results of the 4th Southern provincial council election held on 10 June 1999:

Uva Province
Results of the 3rd Uva provincial council election held on 6 April 1999:

Western Province
Results of the 3rd Western provincial council election held on 6 April 1999:

References

Other sources

 
 
 
 
 
 
 
 
 

1999 elections in Asia
1999 in Sri Lanka
1999
January 1999 events in Asia
April 1999 events in Asia
June 1999 events in Asia
Indian Peace Keeping Force